The Columbia Plateau State Park Trail is a ,  corridor in eastern Washington state maintained as part of the Washington State Park system. The rail trail runs along the abandoned right-of-way of the former Spokane, Portland and Seattle Railway.

Route
Beginning at Cheney, Washington, the trail runs to the confluence of the Snake and Columbia rivers at Pasco, passing through five counties in the southeastern part of the state. The trail is mostly gravel, except for a 3.75 mile portion between the Cheney and Fish Lake trailheads. Recreational uses include hiking, mountain biking, horseback riding, in-line skating on paved portions, and wildlife viewing. The close proximity of the railroad to the paved portion makes this section of the trail a popular spot for railfanning.

Access points

Proceeding from the northeast toward the southwest, major access points include:
 Fishlake trailhead – Milepost 365
 Cheney Trailhead – Milepost 361.25
 Amber Lake Trailhead – Milestone 349.25
 Martin Road Trailhead – Milestone 342
 Lamont Trailhead
 John Wayne Pioneer Trail intersection (no trailhead)
 Benge Trailhead
 Washtucna Trailhead (Trail Administrative Area in downtown Washtucna)
 Kahlotus Trailhead & Visitor Center 
 Snake River Junction Trailhead
 Ice Harbor Dam Trailhead 
 Sacajawea State Park Pasco

History
The rail bed was constructed by the Spokane, Portland and Seattle Railway Company in the early 1900s. That line's successor, the Burlington Northern Company, abandoned the line in 1987, paving the way for the state to acquire 130 miles of right-of-way, from milepost 235.0 near East Pasco to milepost 365.0 near South Cheney, in 1991. State Park management began in 1992. Standing remnants of the trail's railroad past include the historic Burr Canyon Trestle built in 1908.

Natural features

Wildlife
The northern portion of the trail passes through a habitat of primarily ponderosa pine/grassland mixed with exposed basalt cliffs and areas of meadow and shrub-steppe. The numerous erosion-created potholes have formed over 130 marshes, wetlands and lakes which attract a wide range of waterfowl; more than 200 different kinds of birds have been recorded in this area. Other wildlife inhabiting the reserve include elk, mule deer, white-tailed deer, coyotes, badgers, porcupines, muskrats, and beavers.

Geology

As it crosses the Columbia River Plateau, the trail passes through the unique geological erosion features of the channeled scablands created by the cataclysmic Missoula Floods that swept periodically across this portion of eastern Washington as well as other parts of  the Columbia River Plateau during the Pleistocene epoch. The trail follows one of the many paths taken by the Missoula Floods as they cut through the Columbia River Basalt. Notable geologic features which the trail passes include the Cow Creek scabland, the point at which the Palouse River departs its former course (captured by ice-age flood erosion), Washtucna Coulee (the abandoned  course of the Palouse River scoured wide by the floods), Devil's Canyon (a dry, straight,  former flood channel which descends to the Snake River), giant current-created ripples formed by the flood currents in the low lands along the Snake River, and the Walker Bar, created by the outflow of the floods.

References

External links

Columbia Plateau Trail State Park Washington State Parks and Recreation Commission
Columbia Plateau Trail State Park North Map Washington State Parks and Recreation Commission 
Columbia Plateau Trail State Park South Map Washington State Parks and Recreation Commission

Protected areas of Adams County, Washington
Protected areas of Franklin County, Washington
Protected areas of Lincoln County, Washington
Protected areas of Spokane County, Washington
Protected areas of Whitman County, Washington
State parks of Washington (state)
Hiking trails in Washington (state)
Rail trails in Washington (state)
1991 establishments in Washington (state)
Protected areas established in 1991